Changsin-dong is a dong, neighbourhood of Jongno-gu in Seoul, South Korea.

Attractions
 Changsin-dong Toy Wholesale Market - the largest toy and stationery market in Korea since 1975 and is accessible from Dongdaemun Station on Seoul Subway Line 1 and Line 4.

See also 
Administrative divisions of South Korea

References

External links
 Jongno-gu Official site in English
 Status quo of Jongno-gu by administrative dong 
 Changsin 1-dong Resident office 
 Origin of Changsin 1-dong name

Neighbourhoods of Jongno-gu